Bhoomidevi Pushpiniyayi is a 1974 Indian Malayalam film, directed by Hariharan and produced by P. K. Kaimal. The film stars Prem Nazir, Madhu, Sukumari and Jayabharathi in the lead roles. The film had musical score by G. Devarajan. The film was a remake of the Tamil film Ponnukku Thanga Manasu.

Cast

Prem Nazir as Sethumadhavan
Madhu as Jagadeesh
Sukumari as Bhanu
Jayabharathi as Indu
KPAC Lalitha as Meenakshi
Adoor Bhasi as Menon
Muthukulam Raghavan Pillai as Panicker
Sankaradi as Pachupilla
Mookkannoor Sebastian
Bahadoor as Appunni
K. P. Ummer as Madhava Menon
Meena as Doctor
Santo Krishnan
Vidhubala as Jaya

Soundtrack
The music was composed by G. Devarajan and the lyrics were written by Vayalar Ramavarma.

References

External links
 

1974 films
1970s Malayalam-language films
Malayalam remakes of Tamil films
Films directed by Hariharan
Films scored by G. Devarajan